104 may refer to:
104 (number), a natural number
AD 104, a year in the 2nd century AD
104 BC, a year in the 2nd century BC
104 (MBTA bus), Massachusetts Bay Transportation Authority bus route
Hundred and Four (or Council of 104), a Carthaginian tribunal of judges
104 (City of Edinburgh) Field Squadron, Royal Engineers, a Scottish military unit
104 (Tyne) Army Engineer Regiment, Royal Engineers, an English military unit
104 (barge), cargo ship in service in the 1890s

See also
10/4 (disambiguation)
Rutherfordium, chemical element with atomic number 104